Crowle North railway station, officially known as Crowle railway station, was a station that served the market town of Crowle, on the Isle of Axholme in Lincolnshire, England on the Axholme Joint Railway. The North designation was used to avoid confusion with Crowle railway station on a neighbouring line.

The station was opened on 10 August 1903. The station closed with the end of passenger services on the line on 17 July 1933, Although the line remained open to goods traffic until 1965.

Until 1972 the line through Crowle to Belton was operated as 'a long siding' to facilitate access for heavy loads to Keadby Power Station.

This was the Station Master's House and Booking Office for Crowle on the Axholme Joint Railway, a light railway that ran the length of the Isle of Axholme.

The booking office was situated in the low single storey wooden extension and its interior has been preserved

The station had two low platforms, a passing loop and a small goods yard with a public weighbridge.

Former services

References

Disused railway stations in the Borough of North Lincolnshire
Former Axholme Joint Railway stations
Railway stations in Great Britain opened in 1903
Railway stations in Great Britain closed in 1933